Stuart Goodman (born June 9, 1967) is a former gubernatorial policy advisor and current government relations consultant (lobbyist) in Arizona.

Career 

Goodman is a founding principal with Goodman Schwartz Public Affairs, a government relations firm located in Phoenix, Arizona.

Prior to establishing the firm in July 2000, Goodman served as a senior policy advisor to Arizona Governor Jane Dee Hull from 1997 to 2000.  Goodman was the director of Intergovernmental Relations for the  City of Glendale during the tenure of Mayor Elaine Scruggs from 1994 to 1997.  Goodman served as the Legislative Liaison for the Arizona Department of Administration during the Symington Administration from 1992 to 1994.  Prior to his experience in state and local government, Goodman was the Associate Director of Government Affairs for the Arizona Multihousing Association from 1990 to 1992.

Goodman has contributed his talents to a number of civic causes and is a past president of Public Affairs Professionals of Arizona and is a former chairman of the Arizona Board of Athletic Trainers.  He is a recipient of the Phoenix Business Journal's Forty-Under-40 Award (Class of 2006).

Military experience 

Goodman was commissioned an Ensign in the U.S. Navy Reserve in 1999 and graduated from the Direct Commission Officers School at NAS Pensacola.  Goodman was promoted to Lieutenant Junior Grade in 2001 and Lieutenant in 2003. Goodman was assigned to Supply Support Battalion ONE, headquartered in Phoenix, Arizona.

Military awards include Navy and Marine Corps Commendation Medal, Navy and Marine Corps Achievement Medal, National Defense Service Medal, Armed Forces Expeditionary Medal, Navy Reserve Sea Service Ribbon among other awards. Lieutenant Goodman served honorably through 2009.

Education 

Goodman holds an undergraduate degree in Economics (1989) and a Master of Public Administration (1992), both from Arizona State University.  He also completed the Program for Senior Executives in State and Local Government at Harvard University’s John F. Kennedy School of Government (1995).

Personal life 

In 2013, Goodman married Elizabeth Navran Goodman, an attorney with the Arizona House of Representatives.  Goodman has two adult children from a previous marriage.

References 

American lobbyists
1967 births
Living people
ASU College of Public Service & Community Solutions alumni
Harvard Kennedy School alumni